A chapel is a Christian place of prayer and worship that is usually relatively small.  The term has several meanings. First, smaller spaces inside a church that have their own altar are often called chapels; the Lady chapel is a common type of these.  Second, a chapel is a place of worship, sometimes non-denominational, that is part of a building, complex, or vessel with some other main purpose, such as a school, college, hospital, palace or large aristocratic house, castle, barracks, prison, funeral home, cemetery, airport, or a military or commercial ship.  Third, chapels are small places of worship, built as satellite sites by a church or monastery, for example in remote areas; these are often called a chapel of ease.  A feature of all these types is that often no clergy were permanently resident or specifically attached to the chapel.

Finally, for historical reasons, chapel is also often the term used by independent or nonconformist denominations for their places of worship in Great Britain, even where they are large and in practice they operate as a parish church.

The earliest Christian places of worship are now often referred to as chapels, as they were not dedicated buildings but rather a dedicated chamber within a building. Most larger churches had one or more secondary altars which, if they occupied a distinct space, would often be called a chapel. In Russian Orthodox tradition, the chapels were built underneath city gates, where most people could visit them. The most famous example is the Iberian Chapel.

Although chapels frequently refer to Christian places of worship, they are also commonly found in Jewish synagogues and do not necessarily denote a specific denomination. In England—where the Church of England is established by law—non-denominational or inter-faith chapels in such institutions may nonetheless be consecrated by the local Anglican bishop. Non-denominational chapels are commonly encountered as part of a non-religious institution such as a hospital, airport, university or prison. Many military installations have chapels for the use of military personnel, normally under the leadership of a military chaplain.

History
The earliest Christian places of worship were not dedicated buildings but rather a dedicated chamber within a building, such as a room in an individual's home. Here one or two people could pray without being part of a communion/congregation. People who like to use chapels may find it peaceful and relaxing to be away from the stress of life, without other people moving around them.

The word "chapel", like the associated word "chaplain", is ultimately derived from Latin. More specifically, the word "chapel" is derived from a relic of Saint Martin of Tours: traditional stories about Martin relate that while he was still a soldier, he cut his military cloak in half to give part to a beggar in need. The other half he wore over his shoulders as a "small cape". The beggar, the stories claim, was Christ in disguise, and Martin experienced a conversion of heart, becoming first a monk, then abbot, then bishop. This cape came into the possession of the Frankish kings, and they kept the relic with them as they did battle. The tent which kept the cape was called the capella and the priests who said daily Mass in the tent were known as the capellani. From these words, via Old French, we get the names "chapel" and "chaplain".

The word also appears in the Irish language in the Middle Ages, as Welsh people came with the Norman and Old English invaders to the island of Ireland. While the traditional Irish word for church was eaglais (derived from ecclesia), a new word, séipéal (from cappella), came into usage.

In British history, "chapel" or "meeting house" were formerly the standard designations for church buildings belonging to independent or Nonconformist religious societies and their members. They were particularly associated with the pre-eminence of independent religious practice in rural regions of England and Wales, the northern industrial towns of the late 18th and 19th centuries, and centres of population close to but outside the City of London. As a result, "chapel" is sometimes used as an adjective in the UK to describe the members of such churches: for example in the sentence "I'm Chapel."

Types of chapel

A bridge chapel is a small place of Christian worship, built either on, or immediately adjacent to, a road bridge; they were commonly established during pre-Reformation mediaeval era in Europe.
A castle chapel, in European architecture, is a chapel built within a castle.
A parecclesion or parakklesion is a type of side chapel found in Byzantine architecture.
A capilla posa (Posa chapel) is an architectural feature of the monastery-ensembles of Mexico in the 16th century, consisting of four vaulted quadrangular buildings located at the ends of the atrium outside them.
A capilla abierta (open chapel) is one of the most distinct Mexican church construction forms, mostly built in the 16th century during the early colonial period.
A proprietary chapel is one that originally belonged to a private individual. In the 19th century they were common, often being built to cope with urbanisation. Frequently they were established by evangelical philanthropists with a vision of spreading Christianity in cities whose needs could no longer be met by the parishes. Some functioned more privately, with a wealthy person building a chapel so that they could invite their favorite preachers. They are anomalies in the English ecclesiastical law, having no parish area, but being permitted to have an Anglican clergyman licensed there. Historically many Anglican churches were proprietary chapels. Over the years they have often been converted into normal parishes.
A court chapel is a chapel as a musical ensemble associated with a royal or noble court. Most of these are royal (court) chapels, but when the ruler of the court is not a king, the more generic "court chapel" is used, for instance for an imperial court.

Modern usage

While the word "chapel" is not exclusively limited to Christian terminology, it is most often found in that context. Nonetheless, the word's meaning can vary by denomination, and non-denominational chapels (sometimes called "meditation rooms") can be found in many hospitals, airports, and even the United Nations headquarters. Chapels can also be found for worship in Judaism.

The word "chapel" is in particularly common usage in the United Kingdom, and especially in Wales, for  Nonconformist places of worship; and in Scotland and Ireland for Roman Catholic churches. In England and Wales, due to the rise in Nonconformist chapels during the late 18th and early 19th centuries, by the time of the  1851 census, more people attended the independent chapels than attended the state religion's Anglican churches. (The Anglican Church does not function as the established church in Scotland.)

In Roman Catholic Church canon law, a chapel, technically called an  "oratory", is a building or part thereof dedicated to the celebration of services, particularly the Mass, which is not a parish church. This may be a private chapel, for the use of one person or a select group (a bishop's private chapel, or the chapel of a convent, for instance); a semi-public oratory, which is partially available to the general public (a seminary chapel that welcomes visitors to services, for instance); or a public oratory (for instance, a hospital or university chapel).

Chapels that are built as part of a larger church are holy areas set aside for some specific use or purpose: for instance, many cathedrals and large churches have a "Lady Chapel" in the apse, dedicated to the  Virgin Mary; parish churches may have such a "Lady Chapel" in a side aisle or a "Chapel of Reservation" or "Blessed Sacrament Chapel" where the consecrated bread of the Eucharist is kept in reserve between services, for the purpose of taking Holy Communion to the sick and housebound and, in some Christian traditions, for devotional purposes.

Common uses of the word chapel today include:

Side-chapel – a chapel within a cathedral or larger church building.
Lady chapel – really a form of side chapel, but notable separately as such chapels are common in the Roman Catholic Church and the Anglican Communion. They are dedicated to the veneration of the Blessed Virgin Mary.
Ambassador's chapel – originally created to allow ambassadors from Catholic countries to worship whilst on duty in Protestant countries.
Bishop's chapel – in Anglican and Roman Catholic canon law, bishops have the right to have a chapel in their own home, even when travelling (such personal chapels may be granted only as a favor to other priests)
Chapel of rest – not a place of worship as such, but a comfortably decorated room in a funeral director's premises, where family and friends can view the deceased before a funeral.
Chapel of ease – constructed in large parishes to allow parishioners easy access to a church or chapel.
Multifaith chapel – found within hospitals, airports and universities, etc.; often converted from being exclusively Christian.
Summer chapel – a small church in a resort area that functions only during the summer when vacationers are present.
Wayside chapel or Country chapel – small chapels in the countryside
Military chapel – U.S. military bases often have chapels designated for use by varying denominations. As no specific denomination or faith is the "owner", such a site is commonly referred to as a chapel instead of a church, mosque, or synagogue. Service members can often receive services for nondenominational Christian, Roman Catholic, Islamic, and Jewish faiths, as well as information for other services in the local area.
Wedding chapel – a venue for weddings.
Funeral chapel – a venue for funerals at a funeral home, cemetery or crematorium.

The first airport chapel was created in 1951 in Boston for airport workers but grew to include travelers. It was originally Catholic, but chapels today are often multifaith.

Notable chapels

Gallery

See also
Castle chapel
Chapel (music)
Church (building)
Meeting house
Sacri Monti
Corpse road
Railroad chapel car
Capilla abierta
Capilla posa

References

External links

 Russian chapels photo gallery

 
Types of church buildings